Kharkara is a village in Behror Tehsil in Alwar District in the state of Rajasthan, India. It is situated about 3 km west to Behror on Tasing road.

People in Kharkara are basically farmers in occupation.

Villages in Alwar district